Kulakovo is a rural locality (a village) in Bogorodskoye Rural Settlement, Ust-Kubinsky District, Vologda Oblast, Russia. The population was 1 as of 2002.

Geography 
Kulakovo is located 65 km northwest of Ustye (the district's administrative centre) by road. Kapelino is the nearest rural locality.

References 

Rural localities in Ust-Kubinsky District